Oleksandr Svitlychniy (born 23 August 1972) is a Ukrainian gymnast. He won a bronze medal at the 1996 Summer Olympics, and a silver medal at the 2000 Summer Olympics.

References

External links
 

1972 births
Living people
Ukrainian male artistic gymnasts
Olympic gymnasts of Ukraine
Gymnasts at the 1996 Summer Olympics
Gymnasts at the 2000 Summer Olympics
Medalists at the 1996 Summer Olympics
Medalists at the 2000 Summer Olympics
Olympic medalists in gymnastics
Olympic bronze medalists for Ukraine
Olympic silver medalists for Ukraine
Sportspeople from Kharkiv
21st-century Ukrainian people